Milea (also romanized as Milia) before 1959: Κωστάνα - Kostana) is a village in the municipality of Filiates, Thesprotia, Greece. The population is 28 (2011 census).

References

Populated places in Thesprotia